Moroso may refer to:
 7724 Moroso, a main-belt asteroid, named after Pascuala Moroso and Rafael Villalobos
 Moroso (company), an Italian furniture manufacturer
 Dick Moroso (fl. 1966–1998), American hot rodder, drag racer, and businessman
 John A. Moroso (1874–1957), American author
 Rob Moroso (1968–1990), NASCAR racing driver